Clare County Council is the authority responsible for local government in County Clare, Ireland. As a county council, it is governed by the Local Government Act 2001. The council is responsible for housing and community, roads and transportation, urban planning and development, amenity and culture, and environment. The council has 28 elected members. Elections are held every five years and are by single transferable vote. The head of the council has the title of Cathaoirleach (Chairperson). The county administration is headed by a Chief Executive, Pat Dowling. The county town is Ennis.

History
Originally meetings of Clare County Council were held at Ennis Courthouse. A new County Building was completed in May 2008.

Local Electoral Areas and Municipal Districts
Clare County Council is divided into the following municipal districts and local electoral areas, defined by electoral divisions.

Current councillors
The following were elected at the 2019 Clare County Council election.

Councillors by electoral area
This list reflects the order in which councillors were elected on 24 May 2019.

Notes

Co-options

References

External links

Politics of County Clare
County councils in the Republic of Ireland